John Jaffer Janardhanan is a 1982 Malayalam-language masala film directed by I. V. Sasi, written by T. Damodaran, starring Ratheesh, Ravindran and Mammootty. It is a remake of the 1977 Hindi film Amar Akbar Anthony.

Plot 
Three brothers were separated at a young age, after their father abandoned them. The reason was because, their father had taken the blame of the crime committed by his master, Robert. The eldest was raised by a Hindu police officer, The second brother was raised by a Church priest, and the youngest was raised by a Muslim tailor.

Many years later, the eldest son, Janardhan, is now a righteous police officer. The second son, is John and the youngest is Jaffer, a qawwali singer.

Soon, the brothers find themselves falling in love. Janardhan falls for Jenny, a crook. John falls for Nancy in an Easter festival. Jaffer falls for Sophia, the daughter of Kasim.

Finally, the brothers realise their bitter past, and wants to avenge the one who caused them trouble. They come in disguise to Robert's house. They succeed and the movie ends as the brothers unite with their parents and lovers.

Cast 
 Ratheesh as John Vincent
 Ravindran as Jaffer
 Mammootty as Janardhanan
 Balan K. Nair as Chandran
 Jose Prakash as Robert
 Kuthiravattam Pappu as Charlie
 Captain Raju as Renji
 K.P.A.C. Sunny as Nanu
 Prathapachandran
 Lalu Alex as Roberts Gunda
 P. K. Abraham as Father
 Nellikode Bhaskaran as Kasim
 K. R. Vijaya as Sumathy
 Madhavi as Nancy
 Sumalatha as Jenny
 Swapna as Sofia
 Surekha as Manju
 Varalakshmi

Soundtrack 
The music was composed by Shyam and the lyrics were written by Sreekumaran Thampi.

References

External links 
 

1980s Malayalam-language films
1982 films
Films directed by I. V. Sasi
Films with screenplays by T. Damodaran
Malayalam remakes of Hindi films
1980s masala films